Purna Bikram Shah, professionally known as Paul Shah is a Nepalese film actor and one of the popular models known for his work in the Nepali film industry. Starting off behind the scenes as an video editor, Shah got his film breakthrough from Nai Nabhannu La 4. Since then, Shah has made an appearance in the romantic drama Ma Yesto Geet Gauchu, action film Johnny Gentleman and family drama Shatru Gate. He later worked in a social romantic drama Bir Birkam 2, part of the Bir Bikram series and Ma Yesto Geet Gauchhu 2.

Filmography

Minor Sex Abuse/Rape Case 
Shah was arrested on 27 February 2022 pending a full investigation, after a 17-year old singer filed a police complaint accusing him of rape in Tanahu District Court on February 23. The District Government Attorney’s Office in the Nawalpur district of Gandaki on February 27 filed a case against actor Paul Shah at the district court, accusing him of raping a minor. The office has demanded the court hand him down a 14-year jail sentence. The accuser later changed her statement on April 17 when, in a statement to the court, she said she had not been raped and had made the false claims after being provoked by some people to do so. 

On 6 September 2022 , The Nawalpur district court clarified the rape and sentenced him to 2.5 years in prison for sexually abusing a minor.

On January 17, 2022, Shah was acquitted of the rape charges by Judge Komal Prasad Acharya of the Tanahun District Court, citing lack of evidence, although currently Shah remains in prison. “The plaintiff can move the appellate court if not satisfied with the verdict,” said Kunwar. 

Acquittal from Charges

On February 26, 2023, actor Paul Shah was acquitted from all charges in a 17-year old minor female singer sex abuse/rape case by the Pokhara High Court.

A joint bench of acting chief judge Dilliraj Acharya and judge Shreedhara Kumari Pudasaini issued the verdict citing lack of evidence to establish the charge against Shah.

On February 27, 2023, actor Shah was released from Tanahu District Jail.

Awards

References

Living people
Nepalese male actors
Nepalese male models
People from Dang District, Nepal
21st-century Nepalese dancers
Year of birth missing (living people)
People convicted of sex crimes